The Balibago National High School, commonly known as BalNaHiS or simply BNHS, is a public high school located at Barangay Balibago, Santa Rosa City, Laguna, Philippines.

See also
 Department of Education (Philippines)

References

High schools in Laguna (province)
Schools in Santa Rosa, Laguna